HMAS Shepparton (J248/M248), named for the city of Shepparton, Victoria, was one of 60 Bathurst-class corvettes constructed during World War II, and one of 36 initially manned and commissioned solely by the Royal Australian Navy (RAN). Commissioned in early 1943, Shepparton was primarily employed as a survey vessel, tasked with updating Age of Sail-era charts and data for regions of New Guinea. The corvette was placed in reserve in 1946, and sold for scrap in 1958.

Design and construction

In 1938, the Australian Commonwealth Naval Board (ACNB) identified the need for a general purpose 'local defence vessel' capable of both anti-submarine and mine-warfare duties, while easy to construct and operate. Construction of the prototype  did not go ahead, but the plans were retained. The need for locally built 'all-rounder' vessels at the start of World War II saw the "Australian Minesweepers" (designated as such to hide their anti-submarine capability, but popularly referred to as "corvettes") approved in September 1939, with 60 constructed during the course of the war: 36 (including Shepparton) ordered by the RAN, 20 ordered by the British Admiralty but manned and commissioned as RAN vessels, and 4 for the Royal Indian Navy.

Shepparton was laid down on 14 November 1941 by HMA Naval Dockyard at Williamstown, Victoria, launched on 15 August 1942 by Lady Goudle, wife of the Victorian Commissioner of Public Works, and commissioned into the RAN on 1 February 1943.

Operational history
Shepparton entered operational service in April 1943, and was primarily employed as an armed survey ship. Shepparton served in New Guinea and New Britain between April 1943 and October 1944, and in the waters of northern Australian until 1 February 1945, at which point she went to Brisbane for refitting. The refit concluded on 2 April 1945, with Shepparton assigned to various areas in northern Australia and the islands of New Guinea, before returning to Brisbane on 21 October 1945.

The corvette received two battle honours for her wartime service: "Pacific 1943" and "New Guinea 1943–44". During the war, Shepparton sailed just over  during 5,072 hours spend underway. The last surveys of many regions of New Guinea and the Solomon Islands had been performed during the Age of Sail, and were woefully inaccurate by modern standards. The accomplishments of Shepparton and other survey ships during the Pacific campaigns generated a wealth of survey and hydrographic data, with one author claiming shortly after the war's end that these areas "are better mapped than the greater part of the Australian mainland, or for that matter, better than many parts of the world which were outside the operative zones of the war."

Fate
Shepparton paid off to reserve on 10 May 1946. She was towed to Sydney by sister ship  in early November 1947, where she remained until her sale for scrap on 20 February 1958. Shepparton was sold to the Mitsubishi Shoji Kaisha company, and was towed to Japan by the Shitako Maru.

Citations

References
Books

Journal and news articles

Bathurst-class corvettes of the Royal Australian Navy
Ships built in Victoria (Australia)
1942 ships
World War II corvettes of Australia
Survey ships of the Royal Australian Navy